Zoltán Kovács (born 2 January 1962) is a Hungarian ice hockey coach and administrator. He joined the Hungarian Ice Hockey Federation as a secretary in 1994, then served as its general secretary from 1998 to 2017, and has served as its vice-president since 2017. He played for the Hungary men's national junior ice hockey team in 1980, and was its manager in 2003 when the team earned promotion to Division I of the IIHF World U20 Championship. He played professionally for Ferencvárosi TC, and sat on several International Ice Hockey Federation (IIHF) committees. The IIHF named Kovács as the 2020 Paul Loicq Award recipient, for his contributions to the IIHF and international hockey.

Playing and coaching career
Kovács was born on 2 January 1962, in Budapest. He later played for the Hungary men's national under-18 ice hockey team at the 1979 IIHF European U18 Championship and the 1980 IIHF European U18 Championship; and then for the Hungary men's national junior ice hockey team in Pool B of the 1980 World Junior Ice Hockey Championships.

Kovács played hockey professionally from 1980 to 1990 with Ferencvárosi TC in Budapest. He won OB I bajnokság championships in 1984 and 1989, and finished his career playing with Dunaújvárosi Acélbikák. He began coaching the Ferencvárosi TC junior team in 1984 while he was playing on the senior team, and coached the Hungary men's national under-16 team from 1987 to 2000. He later coached for MAC Budapest from 2000 to 2008. Notable players on his teams include Levente Szuper, Balázs Sebők and Krisztián Nagy.

Hungarian hockey executive
Kovács joined the Hungarian Ice Hockey Federation (HIHF) as a secretary in 1994, then served as its general secretary from 1998 to 2017, and has served as its vice-president since 2017. When appointed as general secretary, Hungary had only one indoor ice rink, which was not regulation size for international competition. Under his leadership, Hungary had built 34 rinks as of 2022. He also served as a member of the International Ice Hockey Federation (IIHF) recruitment committee from 2010 to 2012, and the ice rink committee from 2016 to 2020. 
 
Kovács served as manager of the Hungary men's national junior ice hockey team from 2000 to 2003, and in 2009. During this time, the team won Division II Group B at the 2003 World Junior Ice Hockey Championships, which earned promotion to Division I for the 2004 championships. His development strategy was to produce talent at the youth age groups to supply players for the national junior and national under-18 teams.

In a 2017 interview, Kovács talked about his new vice-president position. He stated that the HIHF was being transformed to run more like a business, and that his role would be to increase the popularity of hockey in Hungary and include sport diplomacy with other national federations. He became chairman of the technical committee, to develop the men's and women's national teams, and the domestic youth hockey leagues. He arranged for professional Hungarian hockey players to teach skills to youth players, and sought to coordinate competitive youth leagues within Hungary and Austria. He wants to see new arenas built in each county of Hungary to host top-level hockey, and to provide new clubs with equipment and coaching mentors. He felt his greatest success was having the Canada men's national ice hockey team play to a sold-out crowd in the László Papp Budapest Sports Arena and showcase National Hockey League talent to Hungarians. He wants Hungary to host the top level of the Ice Hockey World Championships.

Honors
The IIHF named Kovács as the 2020 Paul Loicq Award recipient, for "outstanding contributions to the IIHF and international ice hockey". The formal presentation was scheduled for the 2020 IIHF World Championship in Zürich, but was delayed until the 2022 IIHF World Championship due to the COVID-19 pandemic. He is the first Hungarian to be named a recipient of the award. In response to the award he said, "I am the winner, but the recognition goes to those who have worked for the last 25 years in the development of Hungarian hockey".

Notes

References

1962 births
Living people
Corvinus University of Budapest alumni
Hungarian ice hockey administrators
Hungarian ice hockey coaches
Hungarian ice hockey players
Ice hockey people from Budapest
International Ice Hockey Federation executives
Paul Loicq Award recipients
Semmelweis University alumni